Jeanine  Journeaux, born Moussier (born 8 April 1930) is a French former sprinter. She competed in the women's 100 metres at the 1948 Summer Olympics and 4 x 100 metres relay.

References

External links
 

1930 births
Possibly living people
Athletes (track and field) at the 1948 Summer Olympics
French female sprinters
Olympic athletes of France
Athletes from Lyon
Olympic female sprinters
20th-century French women